The 1996 ITC Estoril round was the third round of the 1996 International Touring Car Championship season. It took place on 26 May at the Autódromo do Estoril.

Alessandro Nannini won both races, driving an Alfa Romeo 155 V6 TI.

Classification

Qualifying

Race 1

Race 2

Notes:
 – Klaus Ludwig was given a 20-second penalty for causing a collision with Giancarlo Fisichella.

Standings after the event

Drivers' Championship standings

Manufacturers' Championship standings

 Note: Only the top five positions are included for both sets of drivers' standings.

References

External links
Deutsche Tourenwagen Masters official website

1996 International Touring Car Championship season